The submandibular fovea (or submandibular fossa or submaxillary fovea) is an impression on the medial side of the body of the mandible below the mylohyoid line.  It is the location for the submandibular gland.

References

External links
 
 

Bones of the head and neck